David Prinosil and Sandon Stolle were the defending champions, but Prinosil did not participate this year.  Stolle partnered David Adams, losing in the first round.

Yevgeny Kafelnikov and Nenad Zimonjić won the title, defeating Jiří Novák and David Rikl 6–4, 6–4 in the final.

Seeds

  David Adams /  Sandon Stolle (first round)
  Jiří Novák /  David Rikl (final)
  Joshua Eagle /  Andrew Florent (quarterfinals)
  Donald Johnson /  Piet Norval (quarterfinals)

Draw

Draw

External links
 Draw

Vienna Open
2000 ATP Tour
2000 in Austrian tennis